Cubixx HD is a puzzle game developed by UK-based studio Laughing Jackal released on the PlayStation Network in Europe on August 17, 2011  and September 20, 2011 in North America. It is the HD sequel to Cubixx, a 2009 PlayStation mini title.

Gameplay 
The gameplay of Cubixx HD is based upon the classic arcade game Qix. The player controls a robot that fires a laser at a cube with the objective of erasing its sides. A variety of enemies and power-ups become available as the player progresses.

Reception 
Reviews of Cubixx HD have been generally favorable with a Metacritic score of 77 out of 100, with Kristan Reed of Eurogamer praising the title as the best reinvention of its antecedent Qix and Joel Gregory of PlayStation Official Magazine (UK) calling it "one of the most
gloriously addictive, knuckle-bitingly frustrating strategy experiences you can have on PSN."

References

External links 

2011 video games
Ghostlight games
Multiplayer and single-player video games
PlayStation 3 games
PlayStation Network games
Video games developed in the United Kingdom
Windows games
Laughing Jackal games